Ongiara may refer to:
 Ongiara an album by the band the Great Lake Swimmers
 Ongiara (1964), a passenger/vehicle ferry operated by the City of Toronto
 Ongiara (1885), a steam ferry that served most of her life on the Niagara River